The official mind is the ideas, perceptions, and intentions of those policy-makers who had a bearing on British imperial policies.  The policy maker is a politician or civil servant who had influence over imperial policy.

The official mind is extensively written about in Ronald Robinson's extraordinarily influential work, Africa and the Victorians: The Official Mind of Imperialism, was co-authored with John Gallagher and Alice Denny and first published in 1961.  Historian John Darwin states that while the "local habitation" of the official mind is in Whitehall "its real field of operations lay in those diplomatic-strategic
spheres where official control was greatest. In imperial terms that chiefly meant the Mediterranean and Near East."

Bibliography
Notes

References

 - Total pages: 337 
 - Total pages: 491 

Civil services
Public administration
Imperialism